Morgan M. Alexander (born April 10, 1997) is an American professional dirt track racing and stock car racing driver who competes part-time in the ARCA Menards Series and ARCA Menards Series East, driving the No. 41 Chevrolet SS for Cook-Finley Racing and the No. 50 Chevrolet SS for Niece Motorsports, and previously competed part-time in the NASCAR Camping World Truck Series.

Racing career
Alexander began racing at the age of 13 in dirt late models before transitioning to racing on asphalt in stock cars. Alexander made his ARCA Menards Series East debut in the race at Southern National Motorsports Park. He was initially going to drive the No. 50 for Niece Motorsports, but that car ended up being withdrawn and Alexander moved to the No. 41 for Cook-Finley Racing, which had previously been TBA on the entry list. He finished 12th out of 16 cars after suffering electrical problems. Alexander was also scheduled to make his ARCA Menards Series West debut in the race at Irwindale in Cook-Finley's No. 42 car, but he cancelled that planned start and instead used the funding for that race to compete in the NASCAR Camping World Truck Series race at Knoxville with Niece in their No. 44 truck. Alexander did drive the No. 50 for Niece in two races in back-to-back weeks in July: the main ARCA Menards Series race at Berlin and the main ARCA/East Series combination race at Iowa. Alexander crashed in his truck debut at Knoxville with Jessica Friesen.

Personal life
He is not related to former NASCAR drivers Blaise Alexander and Mike Alexander or NASCAR on Fox Xfinity Series play-by-play announcer Adam Alexander.

Motorsports career results

NASCAR
(key) (Bold – Pole position awarded by qualifying time. Italics – Pole position earned by points standings or practice time. * – Most laps led.)

Camping World Truck Series

ARCA Menards Series
(key) (Bold – Pole position awarded by qualifying time. Italics – Pole position earned by points standings or practice time. * – Most laps led.)

ARCA Menards Series East

 Season still in progress

References

External links
 

Living people
NASCAR drivers
ARCA Menards Series drivers
People from Griffin, Georgia
Racing drivers from Georgia (U.S. state)
1997 births